Euphorbieae is a tribe of flowering plants of the family Euphorbiaceae. It comprises 3 subtribes and 6 genera.

Genera 
 Subtribe Anthosteminae
 Anthostema A.Juss.
 Dichostemma Pierre
 Subtribe Euphorbiinae
 Cubanthus Millsp.
 Euphorbia L.
 Subtribe Neoguillauminiinae
 Calycopeplus Planch.
 Neoguillauminia Croizat

See also 
 Taxonomy of the Euphorbiaceae

References

External links 

 
Euphorbiaceae tribes